Gordon Rae (born 3 May 1958) is a retired Scottish footballer, who played mainly as a defender for Hibernian, Partick Thistle, Hamilton Academical and Meadowbank Thistle. He also played sometimes as a centre forward, scoring over 50 goals in the Scottish Football League in his career.

Career 
Rae signed for Hibernian as a 17-year-old from Whitehill Welfare in 1975. He made his first team debut two years later, and scored in a 2–0 win against Rangers at Ibrox in his second appearance. He became club captain, appeared in the marathon 1979 Scottish Cup Final and won a First Division winners' medal in 1981.

Rae was awarded a testimonial match by Hibs in 1988, played against Manchester United. Joe Tortolano was sent off during the match for a tackle on Gordon Strachan.

He joined Partick Thistle for £65,000 in 1990, and helped them win promotion to the Premier Division in 1992. He finished his playing career after the 1992–93 season, during which he played for Hamilton Academical and then Meadowbank Thistle.

He left Meadowbank to become manager of Gala Fairydean, in a spell that coincided with their failed attempt to enter the Scottish Football League in 1994. He was sacked by Gala after a Scottish Cup defeat by East Fife, who then recruited him as an assistant coach.

He went on to manage Edinburgh City before working in Hibs' youth system. He left Hibs in November 2002 to manage junior side Newtongrange Star.

References

External links 

Living people
1958 births
Scottish footballers
Scottish Football League players
Hibernian F.C. players
Partick Thistle F.C. players
Hamilton Academical F.C. players
Livingston F.C. players
Hibernian F.C. non-playing staff
Scottish football managers
F.C. Edinburgh managers
Association football central defenders